Jan Zajíc (July 3, 1950 – February 25, 1969) was a Czech student who committed suicide by self-immolation as a political protest. He was a student of the Střední průmyslová škola železniční (Industrial Highschool of Railways) technical college in Šumperk, specializing in railroads, and was also interested in poetry and humanities.
 
In 1969 he took part in a hunger strike and a commemoration ceremony by students for Jan Palach near the statue of Saint Wenceslas in Prague. 

On the day of the twenty-first anniversary of the Communist takeover (25 February 1969), he travelled to Prague accompanied by three other students. His intention was to warn the public against the forthcoming political "normalization" of the country. He had several letters challenging the people to fight against the Warsaw Pact's military occupation of Czechoslovakia. Around 1:30 in the afternoon he walked into the passageway of the building at No. 39 on Wenceslas Square and ignited his chemical-soaked clothes. He was unable to run out of the door, and collapsed and died in the hallway.

In a letter he left behind he wrote: 

The police prohibited his burial in Prague because they feared demonstrations, such as the ones that followed the burial of Jan Palach.  He was later buried in his hometown of Vítkov. 

After the Velvet Revolution, a bronze cross was set into the ground in front of the National Museum in Wenceslas Square to honour both Palach and Zajíc.

His death mask by sculptor Olbram Zoubek is situated at his high school (now Vyšší odborná škola a střední průmyslová škola Šumperk).

See also 

 Thích Quảng Đức
 Ryszard Siwiec
 Jan Palach
 Evžen Plocek
 Romas Kalanta
 List of political self-immolations

References 
 A biography of Jan Zajic - Website of Charles University in Prague
 A biography of Jan Zajic - Website of Czech Radio
 

1950 births
1969 suicides
College students who committed suicide
People from Vítkov
Warsaw Pact invasion of Czechoslovakia
Self-immolations in protest of the Eastern Bloc
Suicides in Czechoslovakia
Recipients of the Order of Tomáš Garrigue Masaryk
Czech anti-communists
Suicides in the Czech Republic